Soul Survivor or Soul Survivors may refer to:

 Soul Survivors (band), an American soul and rhythm and blues band
 Soul Survivor (book), a 2001 book by Christian author Philip Yancey
 Soul Survivor (charity), a worldwide Christian charity based in Watford, Hertfordshire

Music

Albums 
 Soul Survivors (Soul Survivors album), 1974
 Soul Survivors (Hank Crawford and Jimmy McGriff album), 1986 jazz album
 Soul Survivor (Al Green album), 1987
 Soul Survivor, a 1995 album by Bobby Caldwell
 Soul Survivor (Gorefest album), 1996
 Soul Survivor (Pete Rock album), 1998 album
 Soul Survivor II, a 2004 album by Pete Rock

Songs 
 "Soul Survivor", a song by the Rolling Stones from the 1972 album Exile on Main St.
 "Soul Survivor", a song by C. C. Catch from the 1987 album Like a Hurricane
 "Soul Survivor", a song by L.L. Cool J from the 1993 album 14 Shots to the Dome
 "Sole Survivor" (Helloween song), 1994
 "Soul Survivor", a song by the Dead 60s from the 2005 album The Dead 60s
 "Soul Survivor" (Young Jeezy song), 2005
 "Soul Survivor" (Beverley Knight song), 2010
 "Soul Survivor (...2012)", a song by Angels & Airwaves from the 2010 album Love
 "Soul Survivor", a song by Rita Ora from the 2018 album Phoenix

Film 
 Soul Survivor (film), a 1995 film by Stephen Williams
 Soul Survivors (film), a 2001 film starring Melissa Sagemiller

Television 
 "Soul Survivor" (Charmed), an episode in 2003 of the television series Charmed
 Soul Survivor (Supernatural), an episode in 2014 of the television series Supernatural

See also
Sole Survivor (disambiguation)